The Mississippi Valley State Delta Devils are the college football team representing the Mississippi Valley State University. The Delta Devils play in the NCAA Division I Football Championship Subdivision as a member of the Southwestern Athletic Conference (SWAC). Jerry Rice and Deacon Jones, considered two of the greatest  American football players of all time, spent their college days playing for the team.

History

Classifications
 1953–1972: NCAA College Division
 1973–1979: NCAA Division II
 1980–present: NCAA Division I–AA/FCS
-

Conference memberships
 1953: Independent
 1954–1961: South Central Athletic Conference
 1962–1968: NCAA College Division independent
 1969–present Southwestern Athletic Conference

College Football Hall of Fame members
 Doug Porter
 Jerry Rice
 Willie Totten

Alumni in the NFL
Over 25 Mississippi Valley State alumni have played in the National Football League (NFL), including:
 Carl Byrum
 James Haynes
 Deacon Jones
 Ted Washington Sr.
 Jerry Rice
 Vincent Brown
 Ashley Ambrose

References

External links
 

 
American football teams established in 1953
1953 establishments in Mississippi